Events in the year 1931 in the British Mandate of Palestine.

Incumbents
 High Commissioner – Sir John Chancellor until 20 November; Sir Arthur Grenfell Wauchope
 Emir of Transjordan – Abdullah I bin al-Hussein
 Prime Minister of Transjordan – Hasan Khalid Abu al-Huda until 22 February; Abdallah Sarraj

Events

 According to official statistics there were 4,075 Jewish immigrants during 1931.
5 January – Third Jewish Assembly of Representatives election.
 10 April – The right-wing "revisionist" Zionist armed underground paramilitary group "Irgun" (meaning "Organization", a short form for the full name "National Military Organization", whose acronym in Hebrew is pronounced "Etzel") is founded by Avraham Tehomi together with several other former Haganah commanders. The founders had left the Haganah due to their objection to the official policy of havlagah (restraint), which Jewish political leaders (who had become increasingly controlling of the Haganah) had imposed on the militia, and they demanded more decisive action against the rising Arab violence which targeted Palestinian Jews.
 11 April – Three members of kibbutz Yagur were killed by members of a local Arab gang.
 18 November – The 1931 census of Palestine is carried out by the Mandate authorities under the direction of Major E. Mills.
 22 December – Two members of Nahala Moshav, a man and his son, killed when a bomb was thrown into their home. The attack is attributed to members of the Black Hand Gang.

Unknown dates
 The founding of the kibbutz Ein HaHoresh by Hashomer Hatzair members from Eastern Europe who reclaimed the land.

Notable births
 17 January – Yaakov Gil, Israeli politician (died 2007)
13 February –  Assaf Yaguri, Israeli politician and soldier (died 2000)
 8 August – Yehoshua Matza, Israeli politician (died 2020)
 16 May – Geula Zylberman, Jewish-Palestinian born Venezuelan artist
 24 May – Eliezer Goldberg, Israeli jurist, judge on the Israeli Supreme Court and former State Comptroller of Israel (died 2022)
 5 September – Amnon Rubinstein, Israeli law scholar, politician, and columnist
 20 September – Haya Harareet, Israeli actress (died 2021)
 21 September – Shmuel Auerbach, Israeli Haredi rabbi and posek (died 2018)
 8 October – Sara Kishon, Israeli musician, author, and art collector (died 2002)
 27 October – Shalom Cohen, Israeli rabbi and rosh yeshiva, spiritual leader of the Shas party
 17 November – Amira Sartani, Israeli politician
 27 November – Yaakov Ziv, Israeli computer scientist
 Full date unknown
Michal Har'el, Israeli beauty queen (died 2012)
 Naim Attallah, Palestinian Arab businessman and writer
 Ruth Horam, Israeli painter and sculptor
 Avraham Katz, Israeli politician
 Farouk Kaddoumi, Palestinian Arab, senior member of Fatah
 Shaul Foguel, Israeli mathematician (died 2020)
 Taha Muhammad Ali, Israeli Arab poet (died 2011).
 
 Ram Karmi, Israeli architect (died 2013)

Notable deaths

 16 April – Rachel Bluwstein (commonly referred to as "Rachel the poetess") (born 1890), Russia-born Palestinian Jewish poet.

References

 
Palestine
Years in Mandatory Palestine